Houston County Airport  is a public use airport located three miles (5 km) south of the central business district of Caledonia, a city in Houston County, Minnesota, United States. It is owned by Houston County. It serves general aviation for Caledonia and surrounding towns including Spring Grove and Houston. There is no scheduled air service. The airport opened in 1968.  The dedication of the completed airport was held on September 21, 1969.

Although most U.S. airports use the same three-letter location identifier for the FAA and IATA, Houston County Airport is assigned CHU by the FAA but has no designation from the IATA (which assigned CHU to Chuathbaluk Airport in Chuathbaluk, Alaska).

Facilities and aircraft 

For the 12-month period ending May 31, 2006, the airport had 3,500 aircraft operations, 100% of which are general aviation.

Events 
The Houston County Flyers sponsors a fly-in breakfast at the airport on the last Sunday in June.

The Caledonia Hot Air Balloon Rally is held on the first weekend in December.

References

External links
 

 Red Baron Flyers

Airports in Minnesota
Buildings and structures in Houston County, Minnesota
Transportation in Houston County, Minnesota